The 2011 Shanghai Challenger was a professional tennis tournament played on hard courts. It was the first edition of the tournament which was part of the 2011 ATP Challenger Tour. It took place in Shanghai, China between 5 and 11 September 2011.

ATP entrants

Seeds

 1 Rankings are as of August 29, 2011.

Other entrants
The following players received wildcards into the singles main draw:
  Gong Maoxin
  Li Zhe
  Wu Di
  Zhang Ze

The following players received entry from the qualifying draw:
  Pierre-Ludovic Duclos
  Luka Gregorc
  Hiroki Moriya
  Daniel Yoo

Champions

Singles

 Cedrik-Marcel Stebe def.  Alexander Kudryavtsev, 6–4, 4–6, 7–5

Doubles

 Sanchai Ratiwatana /  Sonchat Ratiwatana def.  Fritz Wolmarans /  Michael Yani, 7–6(7–4), 6–3

External links
ITF Search
ATP official site

Shanghai Challenger
Shanghai Challenger
2011 in Chinese tennis